The Landtag of the Principality of Liechtenstein, commonly referred to as the Landtag of Liechtenstein, is the unicameral parliament of Liechtenstein.

Qualifications
Citizens who have attained the age of 18, have permanent residency in the country and have lived in the country for at least one month before the election can vote, and all eligible voters can run for office. A group of at least 30 voters per constituency has the right to nominate a list of candidates. However, voters can only sign support for nomination for a single list.

Women in Liechtenstein were granted the right to vote in 1984, and thus could not stand for election in the Landtag before then.

Election
Under the Constitution of 1921, the size of the Landtag was set at 15 members. A constitutional amendment approved in a 1988 referendum increased the number to 25, starting with the 1989 elections. Each of the 25 members is elected for a four-year term by open list proportional representation from two constituencies, Oberland with 15 seats and Unterland with 10 seats. The electoral threshold is 8%. Unterland consists of Eschen, Gamprin, Mauren, Ruggell and Schellenberg; Oberland consists of Balzers, Planken, Schaan, Triesen, Triesenberg and Vaduz. The type of open list procedure used is panachage, which allows voters to vote for as many candidates as there are seats to be filled, as well as to delete names from a list and to add names from another list.

Elected along with the lists are substitute members (Stellvertretern). These substitute members take the place of a regular member who cannot attend a meeting of the Landtag, or in the case that the regular member resigns. A party receives one substitute member for every three seats they win in each of the two electoral districts, though every political party is entitled to at least one substitute. Parliamentary groups may be formed in the Landtag for political parties or alliances with at least three elected members. Groups are entitled to their own conference room.

Officers
The Landtag elects from amongst its members a President and a Vice-President at the opening session each year. The President serves as the Speaker of the body. The President, Vice-President and parliamentary group speakers form the Bureau of the Parliament (Landtagspräsidium). The Bureau prepares the budget of the Landtag and hires the staff of the body; it also helps the President prepare the body's agenda for each session of the Landtag.

Committees
The Landtag has three standing committees consisting of five members each:

Foreign Affairs Commission
Finance Commission
Audit Commission

The Landtag may also appoint special committees consisting of three to five members. The body can also form investigative committees for any purpose upon the call of at least seven members.

When the Landtag is out of session, its functions are exercised by the National Committee (Landesausschuss), which acts as a presidium. The National Committee consists of the President, and four other members, two from each of the country's two constituencies.

Last election

See also
 List of presidents of the Landtag of Liechtenstein

References

External links
 

Liechtenstein
Government of Liechtenstein
Liechtenstein
Liechtenstein